Littorinimorpha is a large order of snails, gastropods, consisting primarily of sea snails (marine species), but also including some freshwater snails (aquatic species) and land snails (terrestrial species).

Previously, the Linnaean taxonomy used in the taxonomy of the Gastropoda by Ponder & Lindberg (1997) ranked like this: subclass Orthogastropoda, superorder Caenogastropoda, order Sorbeoconcha, suborder Hypsogastropoda, infraorder Littorinimorpha.

The order Littorinimorpha contains many gastropoda families that were formerly placed in the order Mesogastropoda, as introduced by J. Thiele in his work from 1921. Evidence for this group being monophyletic is scanty. In 2003, E. E. Strong suggested using only Neogastropoda as a clade within the clade Hypsogastropoda, and to include the unresolved superfamilies of the Hypsogastropoda within the Littorinimorpha.

Superfamilies and families 
The superfamilies grouped in this clade include a few families that are well-known based on their shells:

(Extinct taxa indicated by a dagger, †.)
Families brought into synonymy
 Adeorbidae Monterosato, 1884: synonym of Tornidae Sacco, 1896 (1884)
 Paludestrinidae Newton, 1891 accepted as Hydrobiidae Stimpson, 1865
 Pyrgulidae Brusina, 1882 (1869) accepted as Hydrobiidae Stimpson, 1865
 Vitrinellidae Bush, 1897 accepted as Tornidae Sacco, 1896 (1884)

References